The 1953–54 NCAA men's ice hockey season began in November 1953 and concluded with the 1954 NCAA Men's Ice Hockey Tournament's championship game on March 13, 1954 at the Broadmoor Ice Palace in Colorado Springs, Colorado. This was the 7th season in which an NCAA ice hockey championship was held and is the 60th year overall where an NCAA school fielded a team.

Entering the season, in an effort to more accurately reflect the geographic location of the member school, the MCHL changed the conference name to 'Western Intercollegiate Hockey League'.

Regular season

Season tournaments

Standings

1954 NCAA Tournament

Note: * denotes overtime period(s)

Player stats

Scoring leaders
The following players led the league in points at the conclusion of the season.

GP = Games played; G = Goals; A = Assists; Pts = Points; PIM = Penalty minutes

Leading goaltenders
The following goaltenders led the league in goals against average at the end of the regular season while playing at least 33% of their team's total minutes.

GP = Games played; Min = Minutes played; W = Wins; L = Losses; OT = Overtime/shootout losses; GA = Goals against; SO = Shutouts; SV% = Save percentage; GAA = Goals against average

Awards

NCAA

WIHL
No Awards

References

External links
College Hockey Historical Archives
1953–54 NCAA Standings

 
NCAA